Niven is a surname. It is derived from the Scottish Gaelic Mac Cnaimhin.

Notable people
Archibald C. Niven, US politician
 Alan Niven, rock n roll composer, producer and manager Guns n Roses, Great White, The Angels, Clarence Clemons etc
Bryan Niven, US artist
Charles Niven, Scottish mathematician
David Niven, British film actor and author
David Niven, Jr., British film actor
Derek Niven, Scottish footballer
Donald Niven Wheeler, accused Soviet spy
Frances Niven (1949-1997), South African climatologist and speleologist
George Niven, Scottish footballer
Ivan M. Niven, Canadian–American mathematician
Niven's constant, a mathematical constant
Niven numbers, a mathematical concept
Niven's theorem
12513 Niven, asteroid named after Ivan M. Niven
James Niven, Scottish physician
Jennifer Niven, American novelist
Jimmy Niven, Scottish footballer
John Niven, Scottish writer
John Niven (footballer), Scottish footballer
Larry Niven, US science fiction author
Niven's laws, named after Larry Niven
Margaret Graeme Niven, English artist
Peter Niven, Scottish jockey
William Niven, Scottish mineralogist and archeologist
William Davidson Niven (1842–1917), British mathematician and electrical engineer
William Dickie Niven (1879–1965), Professor of Ecclesiastical History

Given name
Niven Busch, US novelist and screenwriter
Niven Govinden, English novelist

Other uses
Niven (restaurant), a Michelin starred restaurant in Rijswijk, Netherlands
Harshad numbers, also called Niven numbers

See also
Nivan

Citations

References

Anglicised Scottish Gaelic-language surnames
Scottish surnames